Noël Amenc (25 December 1889 – 13 March 1955) was a French racing cyclist. He rode in the 1920 Tour de France.

References

1889 births
1955 deaths
French male cyclists